Thommankuthu is a waterfall located in Thodupuzha Thaluk in Idukki District of the southern state of Kerala, India. It is a popular tourist spot in the state and one of the major centres of eco-tourism in Kerala. It is situated in the southern part of Western Ghats mountain range. Thomankoothu waterfalls is not a single waterfall but a series of 12 falls over a distance of 5 km.

Location
Thommankuthu is located 18 km from Thodupuzha. Nearest towns are Karimannoor and Vannappuram and Udumbannoor which are nearly 10 km from Thommankuthu.

Trekking
Thommankuthu waterfall is a seven - step waterfall located in forest. A trek of 12 km through the forests is possible.

References

External links 

 Thommakuthu waterfall, keralatourism.org
 Thommankuthu Waterfalls
 Trek to Thommankuthu

Waterfalls of Kerala
Waterfalls of Idukki district
Tourism in Kerala
Tourism in Idukki district
Tourist attractions in Idukki district